Pet Circle is an Australian online pet supplies company based in Sydney CBD, New South Wales, Australia, founded by Mike Frizell and James Edwards in 2011.

History

Pet Circle was founded as Paws for Life by Mike Frizell and James Edwards in 2011 with headquarters in Sydney CBD, New South Wales, Australia. In early 2014, the company rebranded into the current name.

Founders

As a former management consultant and investment banker, Michael Frizell launched the online pet accessories retailing business in mid 2011 together with his business partner James Edwards.

Growth 
After a $4 million capital fund raising, the company tripled its warehouse operations and expanded its product range. Between 2013 and 2015, the company grew by over 300 per cent.

Awards 
In November 2014, the company was featured on Deloitte’s list of fastest-growing technology companies. In 2015 the company's founder, Mike Frizell was nominated as a finalist in the Ernst and Young's Entrepreneur of the Year Awards.

See also

 Pet store

References

External links
 

Online retailers of Australia
Retail companies established in 2011
Internet properties established in 2011
Pet stores